John Palliser-Yeates was a fictional character created by John Buchan. He appeared in several Buchan novels, notably John Macnab.

He was a banker and sportsman and an old school friend of Edward Leithen and Charles Lamancha.

Appearances
John Macnab (1925)
The Runagates Club	
The Three Hostages
The Courts of the Morning (1929)

References

John Buchan characters